Wedlock Deadlock is an American comedy short released by Columbia Pictures on December 18, 1947 and starring Joe DeRita. The supporting cast features Dorothy Granger and Norman Ollestead. It was the third of four shorts in the Joe DeRita series produced by Columbia from 1946-1948; all entries were remakes of other Columbia shorts.

Premise
Just as Eddie (Joe DeRita) and his bride Betty (Christine McIntyre) are getting settled into their new home, her irascible family comes to visit.

Cast
Joe DeRita - Eddie
Christine McIntyre - Betty 
Esther Howard - Mother 
 Charles Williams - Chester 
 Patsy Moran - Aunt Hortense 
William Newell - Dick
Dorothy Granger - Ruby

Production notes
Wedlock Deadlock is a remake of the Monte Collins short film Unrelated Relations (1936).

DeRita did not think highly of his output at Columbia Pictures, once commenting, "My comedy in those scripts was limited to getting hit on the head with something, then going over to my screen wife to say, 'Honey, don't leave me!' For this kind of comedy material, you could have gotten a busboy to do it and it would have been just as funny."

References

External links

Wedlock Deadlock at threestooges.net

Columbia Pictures short films
Short film remakes
1947 films
Films directed by Edward Bernds
American comedy short films
1947 comedy films
American black-and-white films
1940s American films
1940s English-language films